The 2007–08 Season of BAI Basket (30th edition) ran from November 21, 2008 through May 16, 2009, with 12 teams playing in three different stages: in stage one (regular season) teams played a double round robin system. In stage two, the six best teams played a single round robin tournament in serie A and the last six did the same for the consolation group, serie B. Finally, in stage three (final four) the best four teams from serie A played in a round robin at four rounds for the title. The winners of the regular season and of the serie A are awarded a bonus point for the serie A and the final four, respectively.

BAI Basket Participants (2007–08 Season)

Regular Season (January 25, 2008 - March 09, 2008

Regular Season Standings

Final Four (April 21 - May 16, 2008)

1º de Agosto vs. R. do Libolo

Petro Atlético vs. ASA

R. do Libolo vs. Petro Atlético

ASA vs. 1º de Agosto

R. do Libolo vs. ASA

1º de Agosto vs. Petro Atlético

Final standings

Awards
2008 BAI Basket MVP
  Olímpio Cipriano (PRI)

2008 BAI Basket Top Scorer
  Olímpio Cipriano (PRI)

2008 BAI Basket Top Rebounder
  Kikas (PRI)

2008 BAI Basket Top Assists
  Armando Costa (PRI)

See also
 2008 Angola Basketball Cup
 2008 Angola Basketball Super Cup
Federação Angolana de Basquetebol

External links
  
 Eurobasket.com League Page

Angolan Basketball League seasons
League
Angola